Hits U Missed Vol. 2 is a compilation album from Hip Hop artist Masta Ace. Unlike the first volume, Hits U Missed, which featured all Ace singles, this installment is composed of collaborations and mixtape tracks featuring Ace.

Track listing
"Survival" Koolade featuring Masta Ace
Originally released on the "Survival" single (2004, ABB Records)
"What Am I?" DJ JS-1 featuring Masta Ace
Originally released on DJ JS-1's Ground Control (2003, Yosumi Records)
"Gimme Gimme Gimme" J-Zone featuring Masta Ace
Originally released on J-Zone's $ick of Being Rich (2003, Fat Beats)
"What Is It" Tommy Tee featuring Masta Ace
From Midnight Club II video game (2003)
"Out Da Box" Tony Touch featuring Pete Rock, Large Professor and Masta Ace
Originally released on Tony Touch's The Piece Maker 2 (2004, Landspeed Records)
"Again" DJ Serious featuring Masta Ace
Originally released on the "Again" single (2004, Audio Research)
"Figure 8" UK's Finest & Masta Ace
"The Call" Code Red featuring Masta Ace
Originally released on Code Red's Since Forever Til Forever (2002, 502 Headz Records)
"Family 1st" Punchline featuring Apocalypse & Masta Ace
Originally released on the "Family 1st" single (2003, Get Large Records)
"Boulevard Connection" Edo G, Common and Masta Ace
Originally released on the "CPH Claimin' Respect #2" single (2004, Boulevard Connection Records)
"We Get It Done" Masta Ace, Strick and Joe Buddah
"Get Large" Tribeca featuring Lord Tariq, Mr. Complex & Masta Ace
Originally released on the "Get Large" single (2003, Major League Records)
"Who Killed Hip Hop" Shams the Professor featuring Masta Ace

Masta Ace albums
2005 compilation albums